Don Manuel Burgos (3 December 1871 – 2 July 1947) was a Paraguayan politician and a doctor. He served as Vice President of Paraguay from 1924 to 1928.

References 

1871 births
1947 deaths
Paraguayan physicians
Vice presidents of Paraguay
Presidents of the Senate of Paraguay